Nansemond-Suffolk Academy (NSA) is a private school, founded as a segregation academy in 1966 in Suffolk, Virginia.  NSA has two campuses.  The Main Campus (adjacent to downtown Suffolk) includes 166,000 square feet of educational space situated on a 100 acre wooded campus, and includes the school's athletic facilities and educational space for students from pre-kindergarten to grade 12.  The Harbour View Campus, which opened in 2016, includes an additional 22,000 square foot building for students in pre-kindergarten through grade 3.

History
Nansemond-Suffolk Academy was founded in 1966 as a segregation academy. In 2014, the school spent $500,000 on needs-based scholarships. 9% of the student body of 1,040 were minorities compared to a local population that is 55% minority.

Athletics
The Nansemond-Suffolk Academy football team was commended by the Virginia General Assembly in 2010.

In November 2015, the Nansemond-Suffolk Academy football team won the Virginia Independent Schools Athletic Association Division III state championships. This was the 4th state championship for Saints football. 

In May of 2019, the Nansemond-Suffolk Academy girls Softball Team won the Virginia Independent Schools Athletic Association Division II State Championship.

References

External links
http://www.nsacademy.org/

Educational institutions established in 1966
Segregation academies in Virginia
Schools in Suffolk, Virginia
Private K-12 schools in Virginia
1966 establishments in Virginia